Édouard C. André was a Belgian consul to Manila in 1898.  His services were sought by the American admiral George Dewey in order to assist in Spain's surrender of Manila after the mock Battle of Manila Bay. André took this role after the sickness and death of British consul Edward Henry Rawson-Walker, and acted as intermediary with the Spanish governor Fermín Jáudenes.

References

Footnotes

Bibliography
Trask, David F. The War with Spain in 1898, p.414, Books.Google.com
Belgians Aid Filipinos, The New York Times, February 20, 1901 NYTimes.com (PDF)
Belgians Aid Filipinos.; One Arrested in Manila and the Consul Hastily Leaves Town -- More Men in Custody, Archives, The New York Times, February 20, 1901, Wednesday, NYTimes.com
Chronology for the Philippine Islands and Guam in the Spanish–American War - August 13, 1898, Loc.gov
Shaw, Albert. The American Monthly Review of Reviews, p. 736, Books.Google.com

Belgian diplomats
Year of birth missing
Year of death missing